The Scottish National League Division Three (known as Tennent's National League Division 3 for sponsorship reasons) is the fourth tier of the Scottish League Championship for amateur rugby union clubs in Scotland.

Geographical Location

The Scottish National League Division Three comprises the teams from both South, North, East and West teams located across Scotland.

History
Until 2011, the division was the sixth tier of amateur club rugby in Scotland. For season 2011–12, league reconstruction reduced the number of nationwide leagues from six to two and the division ceased to exist; however, further changes in 2014–15 increased the amount of nationwide leagues to four, and with it the National League Division Three name returned.

In 2022, the number of teams was increased from ten to twelve.

Promotion and relegation
The top two teams are promoted to National League Division Two and the bottom three teams relegated to the appropriate Regional League – Caledonia, East or West – depending on their geographic location. The winners of the top division in each regional league are promoted to Scottish National League Division Three.

2022–2023 teams
Allan Glen's
Berwick
Gordonians
Greenock Wanderers
Hillhead Jordanhill
Howe of Fife
Murrayfield Wanderers
Orkney
Perthshire
Royal High
Strathmore
Whitecraigs

Past winners
Winners of the fourth tier competition – includes National League Division 1 (1973–2012) and National League Division Three (2015–)

Hamilton (as National League Division 1)
Perthshire
Irvine
Falkirk 
Howe of Fife 
Dalziel
Lasswade (National 1)
Championship Leagues A and B
Championship Leagues A and B
Lasswade (as National League Division Three)
GHK
Dumfries Saints
Highland
TBA
TBA
TBA
Lasswade

References

3
5